The Runnymede Corporation is a company based in Newark, Ohio, United States, which owns radio stations WNKO 101.7 MHz FM and WHTH 790 kHz AM, both in Newark, Ohio.

The company was first formed in 1968.

Radio broadcasting companies of the United States
Companies based in Ohio
Newark, Ohio